The inferior labial frenulum, or frenulum labii inferioris (Latin, meaning "little bridle of the lower lip"). is the frenulum connecting the lower gums with the lower lip.

Function 
The inferior labial frenulum, alongside the superior labial frenulum, provides stability to the upper and lower lip.

Medical Conditions 
Absence of the inferior labial frenulum and/or the lingual frenulum is associated with the classical and hypermobility types of Ehlers-Danlos syndrome, but can also be absent in those without any underlying medical conditions.

Tearing of the inferior labial frenulum may occur after being bit, especially after a fall, resulting in bleeding and pain. Treatment can normally be done at home, and usually heals on its own within 3–4 days. Tearing of the inferior labial frenulum may be a sign of domestic abuse.

See also 

 Frenulum
 Human mouth
 Frenulum of tongue
 Lip
 Ehlers-Danlos syndrome

References 

Lips

es:Frenillo del labio inferior
ru:Уздечка нижней губы